Freddy Loix (born 10 November 1970) is a Belgian rally driver.

Career

Loix's career in motor sport began in karting at the age of 15. In 1990, he bought his first rally car, a Lancia Delta group N, though he soon progressed to a Mitsubishi Galant Group N.

1993 saw a big step forward in Loix's career as he became part of the Marlboro World Championship Team driving an Opel Astra and he became the Belgian F2-champion.

Nicknamed Fast Freddy by his fans, he made the switch to four wheel drive in 1996
with a Toyota Celica GT-Four and completed 3 World Rally Championship (WRC) events and a further 6 in 1997. This period saw continuing sponsorship with Marlboro and a switch to the new Toyota Corolla WRC. He took the lead in the 1997 Sanremo Rally but mechanical problems brought an end to his charge for victory.

Loix and his co-driver, Sven Smeets, moved to Mitsubishi in 1999 and campaigned a Mitsubishi Lancer Evolution VI (which was badged as a Carisma GT). His first year with Mitsubishi proved to be a difficult one with Loix being injured in a horrific accident during the Safari Rally. Despite the setback, Loix fought back and achieved 4 fourth places (in Spain, Greece, Sanremo and Australia).

In 2001, and after several successful seasons, the Mitsubishi Lancer, being a Group A car, found itself outdated and incapable of competing on the same level as the new WRC cars that the other teams were running.

Loix signed a two-year contract with Hyundai at the start of 2002. This was a difficult season in the Hyundai Accent WRC and his best result was 6th place on the Rally Australia. Due to funding cutbacks in 2003, the team couldn't develop the car further and Hyundai retired from the WRC following 2003's Rally Australia.

A drive for Peugeot in the last rally of the 2003 calendar, the RAC Rally in Great Britain, not only saw him replace the by then ailing 2001 World Rally Champion Richard Burns, it also saw him finish in 6th place overall in that year's rally. In the 2004 season, Loix completed only 5 WRC events, all for the factory Peugeot team again, in a Peugeot 307 WRC before retiring from the WRC later that season after the 2004 Rally Catalunya. Since 2007 Loix has been competing in the FIA Intercontinental Rally Challenge (IRC) with Peugeot Sport Belgium, driving a Peugeot 207 S2000. Loix is currently the most successful driver in IRC with a total of seven wins, including a hat trick in 2010.

Results

WRC results

IRC results

ERC results

References

External links
Profile at ewrc-results.com
FreddyLoix.com Homepage
Rallybase stat page
World Rally Archive stat page

1970 births
Living people
People from Tongeren
Intercontinental Rally Challenge drivers
World Rally Championship drivers
European Rally Championship drivers
Belgian rally drivers
Sportspeople from Limburg (Belgium)
Peugeot Sport drivers
Toyota Gazoo Racing drivers
20th-century Belgian people
Hyundai Motorsport drivers
Škoda Motorsport drivers